Rostyslav Zaulychnyi (born September 6, 1968 in Lviv) is a retired Ukrainian amateur boxer, who represented the Unified Team (former Soviet Union) and won the Light Heavyweight Silver medal at the 1992 Summer Olympics.

Olympic results
1st round bye
Defeated Jacklord Jacobs (Nigeria) 16-8
Defeated Stephen Wilson (Great Britain) 13-0
Defeated Zoltán Béres (Hungary) RSC 3 (2:51)
Lost to Torsten May (Germany) 3-8

External links 
 profile

1968 births
Living people
Sportspeople from Lviv
Light-heavyweight boxers
Soviet male boxers
Olympic boxers of the Unified Team
Olympic boxers of Ukraine
Boxers at the 1992 Summer Olympics
Boxers at the 1996 Summer Olympics
Olympic silver medalists for the Unified Team
Olympic medalists in boxing
Ukrainian male boxers
Medalists at the 1992 Summer Olympics
AIBA World Boxing Championships medalists